This is a list of mayors of Gold Coast, Queensland.

The Town of South Coast (Present-day Gold Coast) was formed through the amalgamation of Coolangatta and Southport on 17 June 1949.  On 21 March 1958, the town of South Coast was officially renamed to the Town of Gold Coast, and the following year on 16 May 1959, the Gold Coast was proclaimed a city. 
In 1995, the Albert Shire Council and Gold Coast City Council areas were amalgamated to form one Gold Coast.

Pre-Amalgamation (1949-1995)

Post-Amalgamation (1995 – present)

Data drawn from Gold Coast City Council's History Archives.

See also

References

Gold Coast
Mayors Gold Coast City
Mayors